
Gmina Czarna is a rural gmina (administrative district) in Dębica County, Subcarpathian Voivodeship, in south-eastern Poland.

Villages
Gmina Czarna contains the villages and settlements of Borowa, Chotowa, Czarna, Głowaczowa, Golemki, Grabiny, Jaźwiny, Podlesie, Przeryty Bór, Przyborów, Róża, Stara Jastrząbka, Stary Jawornik and Żdżary.

Neighbouring gminas
Gmina Czarna is bordered by the gminas of Dębica, Lisia Góra, Pilzno, Radgoszcz, Radomyśl Wielki, Skrzyszów, Tarnów and Żyraków.

References
Polish official population figures 2006

Czarna
Dębica County